North Catholic High School is a private Catholic high school located in Cranberry Township, Butler County, Pennsylvania. The school's mascot is the Trojan, and its colors are scarlet and gold.

History
North Catholic High School began as an all-boys school in 1939, founded by Bishop Hugh Charles Boyle of the Diocese of Pittsburgh and the Marianists. Girls began enrolling in the school in 1973.  The original location of the high school was in the Pittsburgh neighborhood of Troy Hill, where it remained in operation for 75 years.

On June 2, 2012, the Diocese of Pittsburgh held a groundbreaking ceremony in Cranberry Township to signify the start of the construction of Cardinal Wuerl North Catholic High School, slated to receive students in the fall of 2014.  The school was renamed Cardinal Wuerl North Catholic High School for the 2013–2014 school year after Cardinal Donald Wuerl.

On September 10, 2018, Dayton Daily News revealed that school officials shield some North Catholic faculty accused of sex abuse through transfers to Marian schools in Dayton, Ohio.

Name change

In 2018, the name of the school reverted to North Catholic High School following criticism of Cardinal Wuerl by a grand jury investigation into child abuse in Pennsylvania. There had been calls to remove the Cardinal's name since the grand jury report was released and the words "Cardinal Wuerl" on the sign outside of the school were spraypainted over by unknown vandals. The name was removed at the request of the Cardinal.

Extracurricular activities
In 2016, the North Catholic marching band was revitalized after ten years of its absence. The marching band, along with other bands at North Catholic, continues to grow each year. The marching band performs halftime shows at both away and home football games and participates in parades.

Notable alumni 
Michael Hayden — former Director of the National Security Agency, Principal Deputy Director of National Intelligence, and Director of the Central Intelligence Agency
Jack Perkowski — first major Wall Street investor in Mainland China
Daniel M. Rooney — owner and chairman of NFL's Pittsburgh Steelers
Dan Onorato — Chief Executive, Allegheny County (2003–2012)
Kevin Colbert — Director of Football Operations (GM), Pittsburgh Steelers (2000–present)
Luke Ravenstahl ('98) — former Mayor of Pittsburgh
Bill Yoest — All-American football player

References

Catholic secondary schools in Pennsylvania
Educational institutions established in 1939
1939 establishments in Pennsylvania
Marianist schools